Rising Low is Mike Gordon's second feature film – a documentary based on the life and death of Gov't Mule bassist Allen Woody and the making of a double-disc tribute album featuring a host of legendary bass players. Throughout the film, Gordon interviews Woody's family and bandmates and also discusses the philosophy and technique of bass playing with a number of the instrument's legends, including Chris Squire, Les Claypool, John Entwistle, Flea, Bootsy Collins, Mike Watt, Roger Glover and others.

See also The Deep End, Volume 1 & The Deep End, Volume 2

External links
 

Documentary films about rock music and musicians